Mr Mulligan may refer to:

 Mr Mulligan (horse), a Thoroughbred racehorse
 Howard DGA-6, an aircraft nicknamed "Mister Mulligan"

See also 
 Mulligan (surname)